Gorm W. Decem Jensen (2 January 1886 – 1 January 1968) was a Danish gymnast who competed in the 1908 Summer Olympics. In 1908 he finished fourth with the Danish team in the team competition.

References

External links
 

1886 births
1968 deaths
Danish male artistic gymnasts
Olympic gymnasts of Denmark
Gymnasts at the 1908 Summer Olympics